Agnicourt-et-Séchelles
 Marie-Jean Hérault de Séchelles
 Jean Moreau de Séchelles

See also 
 Seychelles